The Great Gambler is a 1979 Indian crime action film directed by Shakti Samanta. The film stars Amitabh Bachchan, Zeenat Aman, Neetu Singh in lead roles. It was based on the Bengali novel Great Gambler by Vikramaditya. 

The film's story is based on international gangsters, spies, and secret agents of different countries' intelligence agencies and their undercover operations. This film had high production costs with a significant portions of it being shot in international locations including Cairo, Lisbon, Venice and Rome, and in India, many scenes were shot in Goa. The film was a box office failure on initial release but has been widely appreciated for its action, direction, and cinematography. It has since attained cult status.

Plot 
Jay is an expert gambler, has been for as long as he can remember and has never lost a game. These skills bring him to the attention of the underworld don Ratan Das, who is interested in hiring him to win large amounts of money from rich people and then influencing them into doing whatever he wants. Jay agrees to do so and plays successfully, though unknowingly to entrap Nath, who works for the government. After losing large amounts of money, he is blackmailed into revealing the blueprints of a top-secret military laser weapon that can hit any target within 50 miles and is wanted by an underworld don named Saxena. When the Indian police come to know of this, they assign the case to Inspector Vijay, who is a lookalike of Jay.

Jay and Vijay's paths are soon intertwined when they both travel to Rome with separate missions. Vijay is sent to retrieve the evidence against underworld don Saxena by one of his former henchman and Jay is onto a money-making scheme where he would marry Mala to inherit her money. Mala, however, meets Vijay at the Rome airport and Vijay decides to go along with this to find out who his lookalike is. Jai meets Shabnam, a club dancer who mistakes him for Vijay and was sent by Saxena to stop him on his mission to discover Saxena's plans. It is later revealed that Jay and Vijay are actually long-lost twin brothers and together they team up to stop Saxena from retrieving the laser weapon.

Cast 
Amitabh Bachchan as Jay / CID Inspector Vijay (Double Role)
Zeenat Aman as Shabnam
Neetu Singh as Mala
Prem Chopra as Ramesh / Abbasi
Madan Puri as Ratan Das
Sujit Kumar as Marconi
Utpal Dutt as Mr. Saxena
Roopesh Kumar as Sethi
Helen as Monica 
Iftekhar as Deepchand
Jagdish Raj as Nath
Om Shivpuri as CID Head Sen Verma

Production 
Amjad Khan was initially cast as the character Saxena; due to a road accident, he was unable to continue, and was replaced by Utpal Dutt.

Music 
All lyrics were written by Anand Bakshi. Music was composed by R. D. Burman.

The song "Do Lafzon Ki Hai Dil Ki Kahani" was shot on a Gondola in Venice's Grand Canal.

References

External links 

1970s crime action films
1970s Hindi-language films
Films directed by Shakti Samanta
Films scored by R. D. Burman
Films shot in Amsterdam
Films shot in Egypt
Films shot in Italy
Films shot in Lisbon
Films shot in Mumbai
Films shot in Portugal
Films shot in Rome
Films shot in Venice
Indian crime action films
Indian films with live action and animation